The following is the list of the 23 stations on the Naples Metro system in Naples, Italy.

References

 
Naples
Naples
.
Metro
Railway stations in Italy opened in the 21st century